Victor Vaughen Morris (August 5, 1873 – June 11, 1929) was an American immigrant to Peru and businessman and bar owner best known for inventing the Pisco Sour, the national drink of Peru.

Origins
Morris was born in Salt Lake City, Utah. Descending from a pioneer family, his father was a businessman and a polygamist having served there as a Mormon bishop and his grandfather and great-grandfather had played a prominent role in the founding of the city. He was for several years manager for the B.C. Morris Floral Company but later assumed the direction of the retail stores of Salt Lake Floral Company. He was both popular and energetic and a success as President of the American Florist society. 
Victor was a leading spirit in Lodge No. 85 of the Elks.

Morris' Bar, Lima, Peru

In 1903, he traveled to Peru to work as a cashier for the Cerro de Pasco Railway Company. Then, in 1915, he moved to Lima and, on April 1, 1916, founded Morris' Bar.

Located in 847 Calle Boza  (close to the Plaza Mayor of Lima), Morris' Bar served as a gathering spot for the Peruvian upper class and English-speaking foreigners. According to Peruvian researcher Guillermo Toro-Lira, among the notable individuals who attended Morris' Bar were Elmer Faucett (founder of the Faucett Perú airline), José Lindley (founder of the Corporación José R. Lindley S.A. and Inca Kola), Alfred L. Kroeber (the cultural anthropologist), and Richard Halliburton (an adventurer and cultural ambassador to Peru). The saloon was also a center of drink experimentation for Morris. Nicknamed Gringo, Victor Morris created the Pisco Sour as a variety of the whiskey sour.

John Tinker Glidden, an M.I.T. mining engineer, author of scholarly articles on ore extraction and "peruvian [andean] labor," chief foreman at Yawriqucha (since 1907), and husband  to "a Peruvian lady (whose name was Angélica) and had two daughters," was "perhaps" the first non-employee and unaffiliated registrant to sign the Morris' Bar Visitor Register. His signature, along with a handwritten comment, appeared in the Register on Wednesday, October 4, 1922. That date marked almost two years since Morris' introduction of the Pisco Sour, or a variant thereof, to Euramerican drinking culture---without Angostura bitters and egg whites, which Morris bartender Mario Bruiget added sometime between 1924-29. Glidden reflected on the bar's most excellent libations and services, commenting that "perfection is made of attention to trifles and yet perfection is no trifle."

See also 
Mixology
Peruvian cuisine
Pisco

Whiskey Sour

References

External links 

1873 births
1929 deaths
American bartenders
People from Salt Lake City
Pisco
American expatriates in Peru